Zane Trace High School is a public high school near Chillicothe, Ohio, seated along the shores of Kinnikinnick Creek. It is the only high school in the Zane Trace Local School District. Their nickname is the Pioneers, and their colors are red, blue, and white. Their sports programs include: football, boys and girls cross country, boys and girls soccer, boys and girls basketball, volleyball, cheerleading, boys and girls track, boys and girls bowling, swimming, softball, baseball, wrestling, and e-sports.

History
Zane Trace takes its name from a frontier road built before Ohio statehood by Ebenezer Zane. The road followed historical Native American trails and passed by nearby Kinnikinnick Creek. Zane Trace Local School District was created in 1967 when the school districts of Centralia, Kingston, and Adelphi consolidated.

Awards
 2020 Ohio Department of Education Purple Star Award for Military Support National FFA Chapter Star Winner

Athletics
Zane Trace competes in the Scioto Valley Conference.

The Pioneers have freshman prospect Brice Johnson, who is on the national watch list. However, seeing how he played against Unioto Middle School in 2022, he is most likely not going to play for a Division I school.

Scioto Valley Conference
 Bainbridge Paint Valley Bearcats
 Chillicothe Unioto Sherman Tanks
 Chillicothe Zane Trace Pioneers
 Frankfort Adena Warriors
 Huntington Ross Huntington Huntsmen
 Piketon Redstreaks
 Richmond Dale/Chillicothe Southeastern Panthers
 Williamsport Westfall Mustangs

State Tournament Appearances
 Bowling  2006 State Champions  
 Baseball  1970 & 2001 Final Four 
 Basketball  1970 Final Four 
 Softball  2005 State Runner Up

References

External links
 District website

High schools in Ross County, Ohio
Public high schools in Ohio